4,4′-Diamino-2,2′-stilbenedisulfonic acid is the organic compound with the formula (H2NC6H3SO3H)2C2H2.  It is a white, water-soluble solid.  Structurally, it is a derivative of trans-stilbene, containing amino and sulfonic acid functional groups on each of the two phenyl rings.  

The compound is a popular optical brightener for use in laundry detergents.  

It is produced by reduction of 4,4′-dinitro-2,2′-stilbenedisulfonic acid with iron powder.

References

Benzenesulfonic acids
Cleaning product components
Luminescence
Stilbenoids